Gearbox Records Ltd. is an independent music studio and record label founded in 2009 and based in London and Tokyo. Gearbox emphasizes vinyl records. They started out by releasing previously unreleased archival jazz recordings  from their reel-to-reel tape library, and now publish mostly alternative jazz, folk, and electronic music. Many of their releases are all-analog.

History 
Gearbox was founded by Darrel Sheinman; Hugh Padgham is one of its owners. Adam Sieff was head of sales and marketing.

Work 
They have released music by Sarathy Korwar, Rick Laird and Yusef Lateef, Charles Tolliver, Amber Rubarth, Mark Murphy, Simon Spillett, Chihei Hatakeyama, Dwight Trible, Butcher Brown, Theon Cross, Thelonious Monk, Don Cherry, Nico, Binker and Moses, Abdullah Ibrahim, and Buddy Rich (posthumously). Their recording of Ana Silvera's Oracles with Bill Laurance, Jasper Høiby, Josephine Stephenson was listed by The Guardian as a Critic's Pick.

They have re-released recordings from the defunct PRT Records/Rak Records.

They also market the Gearbox Automatic Mkii turntable.

See also 

 Official web site

Notes 

Recording studios
Record labels